Homecoming – Live from Ireland is the first full-length live album and tenth home video release by the group Celtic Woman, released worldwide on 26 January 2018 by Manhattan Records.

Background
On 20 April 2017, Celtic Woman announced a special performance of their Voices of Angels world tour at the 3Arena in Dublin, Ireland on 2 September of the same year. In July, it was confirmed that the show would be recorded as the next DVD release and concert special for American broadcaster PBS from the group.

The lead performers in the concert are vocalists Mairéad Carlin, Susan McFadden, Éabha McMahon, and instrumentalist Tara McNeill. This is the group's first concert special and home video release to feature McNeill as a lead performer, although she appeared on the group's previous home video release, Destiny, as the harpist of the accompanying live band. For this concert, McNeill performed on both the violin and harp, making it the first time that a lead instrumentalist of the group has performed more than one instrument on one of the group's home video releases.

The concert features members of the Orchestra of Ireland and the Celtic Voices Choir, both of whom appeared on the Voices of Angels album, led by music director Gavin Murphy, who produced, arranged and orchestrated the songs performed. The concert also features guest singer Anabel Sweeney from County Wicklow, Ireland, who won a competition run by the group to perform at the concert.

The concert special and DVD release, entitled Homecoming - Live From Ireland, aired on PBS stations in the United States starting in November 2017, and on television in Ireland on 1 January 2018. The special consists of a subset of songs available on the accompanying live album and DVD release, both of which were made available through PBS pledge drives prior to their official public release worldwide on 26 January 2018. The album consists entirely of live tracks, and while the first made available worldwide, is the second released by the group to do so overall (the United States-exclusive O Christmas Tree also consisted entirely of live tracks, which were taken from the DVD and Blu-ray release of Home for Christmas).

Track listing

Notes
 Track 10 orchestrated by Paul Campbell.

Personnel 
Per the liner notes.

Celtic Woman
 Mairéad Carlin – vocals
 Susan McFadden – vocals
 Éabha McMahon – vocals
 Tara McNeill – fiddle, harp
Celtic Woman Band
 Ray Fean – percussion
 Caítriona Frost – percussion
 Tommy Buckley – guitar
 Anthony Byrne – bagpipes
 Darragh Murphy – uilleann pipes
The Orchestra of Ireland
 Joe Csibi – orchestra contractor
Celtic Voices Choir
 Paul McGough – choir co-ordinator
Special guest
 Anabel Sweeney – vocals
Production
 Gavin Murphy – musical direction
 Méav Ní Mhaolchatha – vocal direction
 Tim Martin – recording and mixing
 Andy Walter – mastering
 Caroline Nesbitt, Designedly – design, art direction

Charts

References

Celtic Woman albums
2018 live albums
2018 video albums
Manhattan Records albums